Ossining may refer to:
Ossining (town), New York, a town in Westchester County, New York state
Ossining (village), New York, a village in the town of Ossining
 Ossining High School, a comprehensive public high school in Ossining village
 Ossining Electric Railway, a former streetcar transit line in Westchester County
Ossining station, a commuter rail stop on the Metro-North Railroad's Hudson Line in Ossining village
"Ossining", a 2003 song by Mike Doughty from Rockity Roll

See also
Sing Sing, a New York state prison located in Ossining